Leopold Figl (2 October 1902 – 9 May 1965) was an Austrian politician of the Austrian People's Party (Christian Democrats) and the first Federal Chancellor after World War II. He was also the youngest Federal Chancellor of Austria after the war before Sebastian Kurz.

Life
Born a farmer's son in the Lower Austrian village of Rust im Tullnerfeld, Figl after graduation as Dipl.-Ing. of Agriculture at the University of Natural Resources and Applied Life Sciences Vienna became vice chair of the Lower Austrian Bauernbund (Farmer's League) in 1931 and chairman in 1933. In 1930, Figl married Hilde Hemala (1906-1989) and had two children.

After the authoritarian revolution of Engelbert Dollfuss, who had served as his mentor within the Farmer's League, Figl became a member of the federal council of economic policy and became leader of the paramilitary organisation of Ostmärkische Sturmscharen for the state of Lower Austria.

After the Anschluss, the Nazis deported Figl to Dachau concentration camp in 1938, from which he was released in May 1943. He then worked as an oil engineer, but in October 1944 Figl was rearrested and brought to Mauthausen concentration camp. On 21 January 1945, he was brought with the later executed resistance fighter Heinrich Maier to Vienna. The folder of his dossier was marked with the abbreviation 'VG' indicating that a Volksgerichtshof (People's Court) trial, often ending with a death penalty, was planned or in preparation. Figl was released on 6 April 1945, when troops of the Soviet Army advanced to the centre of Vienna in an operation which became known as the Vienna Offensive .

After the defeat of the Nazis, the Allies occupied Austria at the end of World War II. The Soviet military commander, Fyodor Tolbukhin, asked Figl to manage the provision of food for the population of Vienna. 
On 14 April 1945 he refounded the Bauernbund and integrated it into the Austrian People's Party (ÖVP), which was founded three days later. Figl was elected vice chair. On 27 April he became interim Governor of Lower Austria and vice-minister.

At the first free elections since 1930, held in December 1945, the ÖVP won with 49.8 percent of the vote and an absolute majority of seats in the legislature. Figl was proposed as Chancellor; the Soviets agreed, because of his opposition to the Nazis and his managerial abilities. Although he could have formed an exclusively ÖVP government, the memories of the factionalism that had plagued the First Republic led him to continue the grand coalition between the People's Party, Socialists and Communists.  The coalition (from which the Communists were pushed out in 1947), remained in office until 1966 and did much to solve the serious economic and social problems left over from World War II. 

After internal criticism, Figl resigned as Chancellor on 26 November 1953. His successor, Julius Raab, was less flexible towards the SPÖ, but was Chancellor when the Austrian State Treaty, which restored sovereignty to the country, was signed on 15 May 1955. However, Figl was strongly involved in its achievement, as he remained in the government as foreign minister. His appearance on the balcony of Belvedere Palace waving the signed paper and speaking the words Österreich ist frei! ("Austria is free!"), as rendered by the Deutsche Wochenschau newsreel, has become an icon in the Austrian national remembrance. (The words were actually spoken before, inside the Palace, but the pictures on the balcony were underlain with the sound track made inside.)

At the national elections of 1959 the SPÖ gained ground on the ÖVP, and the ratio of seats between the two parties in parliament was now almost 1:1. This gave the SPÖ the bargaining power to demand that Bruno Kreisky succeed him as foreign minister. Figl then became president of the National Council 1959–1962, but soon returned to Lower Austria, to become governor of his home state.

Figl was patron of the Pfadfinder Österreichs between 1960 and 1964 and president of this Scout association from 1964 until his death.

He died from kidney cancer in 1965 in Vienna, and is buried in an Ehrengrab at the Zentralfriedhof. His son Johannes was International Commissioner of  the Pfadfinder Österreichs and president of the Pfadfinder und Pfadfinderinnen Österreichs from 1994 to 2000.

Beatification
In December 2020, the Roman Catholic Diocese of Sankt Pölten opened his cause for beatification. He currently holds the title "Servant of God".

Honours and awards
 Grand Cross of the Order of Pius IX
 Honorary Ring of Lower Austria (1952)
 Grand Gold Decoration with Sash of the Order for Services to the Republic of Austria (1954)
 Golden Commander's Cross with the Star of Honour for Services to the Province of Lower Austria

Various locations have been named for Figl:
 Leopold Figl Museum in Michelhausen in Tulln, Lower Austria
 Leopold Figl observatory on the Schöpfl (mountain in the northern Vienna Woods overlooking the Tullnerfeld, Figl's home region)
 Leopold Figl observatory on Tulbinger Kogel in Lower Austria (ditto)
 Leopold Figl court: Vienna 1, District, Franz-Josef-Kai 31-33 (Home, 1963–1967)
 Leopold Figl Lane: Vienna 1, District (next to the historic Lower Austrian House)
 Monument: Vienna 1, District Minoritenplatz (bust, 1973, between Villa and the Federal Chancellery)
 Plaques: Vienna 1, District Schenkenstraße 2 (Home, 1928–1932) and Plaque: Vienna 3, District Kundmanngasse 24 (Home, 1937–1946)

References

External links
 

|-
| border="1" cellpadding="10" align=center width="30%" align="center" | Preceded by:Karl Renner
| width="40%" align="center" | Chancellor of Austria1945–1953
| width="30%" align="center" | Succeeded by:Julius Raab
|-
| border="1" cellpadding="10" align=center width="30%" align="center" | Preceded by:Karl Gruber
| width="40%" align="center" | Minister of Foreign Affairs1953–1959
| width="30%" align="center" | Succeeded by:Bruno Kreisky
|-

1902 births
1965 deaths
20th-century Chancellors of Austria
People from Tulln District
Austrian Roman Catholics
Chancellors of Austria
Foreign ministers of Austria
Austrian People's Party politicians
Burials at the Vienna Central Cemetery
People associated with Scouting
Scouting and Guiding in Austria
Dachau concentration camp survivors
Mauthausen concentration camp survivors
Members of the National Council (Austria)
Governors of Lower Austria (after 1918)
Knights of the Order of Pope Pius IX
Recipients of the Grand Decoration with Sash for Services to the Republic of Austria
Grand Crosses 1st class of the Order of Merit of the Federal Republic of Germany
Austrofascists
Presidents of the National Council (Austria)
Deaths from kidney cancer
University of Natural Resources and Life Sciences, Vienna alumni